Heraklion International Airport "Nikos Kazantzakis"  is the primary airport on the island of Crete, Greece, and the country's second busiest airport after Athens International Airport. It is a shared civil/military facility. The airport is named after Heraklion native Nikos Kazantzakis, a Greek writer and philosopher. Nikos Kazantzakis Airport is Crete's main and busiest airport, serving Heraklion (Ηράκλειο), Aghios Nikolaos (Άγιος Νικόλαος), Malia (Mάλλια), Hersonissos (Χερσόνησος), Stalida (Σταλίδα), Elounda (Ελούντα) and other resorts.

Once completed, the new Kasteli International Airport will replace the current Heraklion International Airport as the hub for central Crete.

History
The airport first opened in March 1939.  This was then merely a piece of flat agricultural land.  The first aeroplane (a Junkers Ju 52) carried the first passengers to the site. During the Second World War, the airfield was the site of the Battle of Heraklion, during the Battle of Crete in 1941. Civilian operations ceased, but in the autumn of 1946 traffic resumed, introducing the DC-3 aircraft.

At first, the airport only offered very basic service, with only primitive installations on the site, in the form of three tents, smoke for wind determination and storm lamps for runway lighting.

In 1947, the first (small) terminal was erected. Hellenic Airlines started commercial flights in 1948. At that time, a total of 4,000 people were served. The year 1953 saw the construction of a paved runway which was initially 1,850 meters long and oriented as 09/27. The next major event followed in 1954, when a four-engined DC-4 aircraft landed for the first time at the airport. In that year the airport handled approximately 18,000 passengers. From 1957 onward, the new Olympic Airways used the airport, starting services with the DC-6 aircraft.

From 1968 until 1971, the runway was extended to 2,680 meters and a new terminal and other facilities were constructed, essentially making it a new airport. On March 18, 1971, the first charter flight from abroad (British Airways) operated at the airport. The new airport itself was officially inaugurated on May 5, 1972.

The airport is scheduled to cease operations in 2025 and to be replaced by the (by then expanded and renamed) Kasteli Airport.

Terminal extension  
The latest airport expansion projects began in October 2017.
 
The latest extension began in October 2017 and was completed on 30 March 2018, in time for the airport's high season.

Airlines and destinations
The following airlines operate regular scheduled and charter flights at Heraklion  Airport:

Statistics

Traffic figures

Historical annual traffic statistics

Other facilities
The airline Bluebird Airways has its head office at the airport.

See also
List of airports in Crete
List of the busiest airports in Greece
Transport in Greece

References

External links

Official Website / Civil Aviation Authority: Heraklion International Airport, "N. Kazantzakis"
Official Website / Airport page: "N. Kazantzakis"
Greek Airport Guide: Iraklio Airport, "N. Kazantzakis"
LGIR on Airliners.net

1937 establishments in Greece
Airports established in 1939
Airports in Greece
Buildings and structures in Crete
Buildings and structures in Heraklion
Tourism in Crete
Hellenic Air Force bases
Airports in Crete